Ceilândia Sul is a Federal District Metro brazilian station on Green line. It was opened for full service on 23 April 2007 as the west terminus of the section between Praça do Relógio and Ceilândia Sul, though the shuttle service at this section started in November 2006. On 16 April 2008 the line was extended to Terminal Ceilândia. The station is located between Centro Metropolitano and Guariroba.

References

Brasília Metro stations
2007 establishments in Brazil
Railway stations opened in 2007